The 2015 African Youth Athletics Championships was the second edition of the biennial athletics competition for African athletes aged fifteen to seventeen, It was held in Reduit, Mauritius from 23–26 April. Mauritius had hosted the 2013 African Junior Athletics Championships two years earlier. A total of 38 events, 18 by boys and 20 by girls, were contested at the competition.

South Africa topped the medals table with seventeen gold medals and 29 medals overall. This marked a great improvement from the inaugural edition in 2013, having missed that event due to a lack of funding. Nigeria who were the previous host only managed to confirm participation due to a late intervention by an anonymous sponsor. The next most successful countries were Kenya (eight golds and 19 in total) and Nigeria (six medals, two of them gold). South Africa won all but one of the gold medals in the throws. Kenya won all the long-distance events at the championships. Eighteen of the twenty-seven participating nations reached the medal table. The host nation Mauritius took one gold medal, through octathlete Bryan Tonta, and ended with a total of seven medals.

As had happened at the 2013 edition, doubles were achieved in both 100 metres and 200 metres sprints: Gift Leotlela of South Africa topped the boys' rankings and his teammate Nicola de Bruyn took the girls' titles. A third athlete managed a double in the rest of the competition – Taylon Bieldt, also of South Africa, won both the girls' hurdling events.

Medal summary

Boys

Girls

Medal table

References

Results
Media Publications. COCAD 15. Retrieved on 2015-04-30.
Complete Results Boys. COCAD 15. Retrieved on 2015-04-30.
Complete Results Girls. COCAD 15. Retrieved on 2015-04-30.
Official Medal Table. COCAD 15. Retrieved on 2015-04-30.
AFRICAN YOUTH CHAMPS RESULTS . AllAthletics.co.za (2015-04-27). Retrieved on 2015-04-30.

External links
Official website

African Youth Athletics Championships
African Youth Athletics Championships
International athletics competitions hosted by Mauritius
African Youth Athletics Championships
Youth Athletics Championships
African Youth Athletics Championships
Youth Athletics Championships